Cryptolechia epistemon is a moth in the family Depressariidae. It was described by Strand in 1920. It is found in Taiwan.

References

Moths described in 1920
Cryptolechia (moth)